The 2006 Toronto Blue Jays season was the franchise's 30th season of Major League Baseball. It resulted in the Blue Jays finishing second in the American League East with a record of 87 wins and 75 losses. For the second straight season, Blue Jays hitters combined for fewer than 1,000 strikeouts. It was the first time since the team's World Series championships in 1992 and 1993 that the Blue Jays had combined for fewer than 1,000 strikeouts in consecutive 162-game seasons, as well as the first season since 1993 that the team finished above third place in its division.

Offseason
December 7, 2005: Lyle Overbay was traded by the Milwaukee Brewers with Ty Taubenheim to the Toronto Blue Jays for Dave Bush, Gabe Gross, and Zach Jackson.
December 27, 2005: Orlando Hudson was traded by the Toronto Blue Jays with Miguel Batista to the Arizona Diamondbacks for Troy Glaus and Sergio Santos (minors).

Regular season

Summary
On January 3, J.P. Ricciardi signed free-agent catcher Jason Phillips to a minor league contract. Phillips, who hit .238 the previous season for the Los Angeles Dodgers, also had an invitation to spring training, was supposed to have competed with Guillermo Quiróz for the role of the Blue Jays' backup catcher. Quiroz was later claimed on waivers by the Seattle Mariners, and Phillips started the season with the team after Gregg Zaun was put on the disabled list.

The trades for Troy Glaus and Lyle Overbay in the off-season created a glut of corner infielders for the Jays, as the team now had five players (Glaus, Overbay, Eric Hinske, Corey Koskie, and Shea Hillenbrand) who could play third base, first base, or designated hitter. The Jays relieved some of this pressure on January 6, by trading Koskie to the Milwaukee Brewers in the second deal between the two clubs in less than a month. The Blue Jays received minor league pitcher Brian Wolfe in return for Koskie. The Blue Jays also moved first baseman (and former third baseman) Eric Hinske to right field as a result.

On February 6, Toronto signed former Angels catcher Bengie Molina to a one-year contract with an option for a second. Three days later, Toronto wrapped up its off season moves by re-signing Shea Hillenbrand and Pete Walker, each to a one-year deal.

On July 2, Troy Glaus, Vernon Wells, Roy Halladay, B. J. Ryan, and Alex Ríos were picked to represent the Blue Jays at the Major League Baseball All-Star Game. However, Rios would not compete in the game due to a serious staph infection that occurred around June 28, possibly as the result of a foul ball off Rios' leg during a game on June 27. Manager John Gibbons was also picked as an assistant coach for the AL team. The five Blue Jay players selected to the AL All-Star team was the most to appear in an All-Star Game since 1993. The only AL team with more All-Stars than the Jays was the World Series champion the Chicago White Sox, with six.

On July 7, Troy Glaus was picked to compete in the 2006 Home Run Derby, though during the Derby, he hit only one home run and was eliminated after the first round.

On July 19, infielder Shea Hillenbrand was designated for assignment after an altercation with the team management. Shortly after Hillenbrand, along with reliever Vinnie Chulk, was traded to the San Francisco Giants for reliever Jeremy Accardo.

On August 3, rookie second baseman Ryan Roberts started his first game in the MLB, and had his first hit, which was a home run. He is one of few Blue Jays rookies to have his first hit a home run in his first start.

On August 12, the Blue Jays got the Minnesota Twins to hit into six double plays, tying a Blue Jays record set on April 16, 1996. (Blue Jays vs. Detroit).

On August 16, the Blue Jays traded reliever Scott Schoeneweis to the Cincinnati Reds for cash considerations or a player to be named later (later announced to be INF Trevor Lawhorn).

On August 17, the Blue Jays traded first and third baseman and outfielder Eric Hinske and cash considerations to the Boston Red Sox for a player to be named later.

During a game against the Oakland Athletics on August 21, 2006, while on the verge of blowing an 8-run lead, John Gibbons walked to the mound to remove starter Ted Lilly. An argument ensued on the mound, in front of the audience at the Rogers Centre. Lilly eventually did leave the game and then headed into the clubhouse. Gibbons subsequently followed him into the hallway, where it appeared to eyewitnesses that he and Lilly got into a fight. Numerous team members and support personnel rushed into the tunnel to break them up. After the game, both the pitcher and manager denied any altercation and said the problem had been resolved.

Despite their on-field and off-field problems, the Blue Jays managed to play well in the critical month of September, going 18–10. This, combined with the slumping of the Boston Red Sox, enabled Toronto to snare sole possession of second place in the American League East by the end of the season. This marked the first time that the Jays had finished above third place in their division since their World Championship season of 1993, and with the most wins since the 1998 season.

On November 17, the Blue Jays announced that they had signed designated hitter Frank Thomas to a two-year contract worth $18 million, with an option for 2009.

On November 28, the Blue Jays announced that they had re-signed catcher Gregg Zaun to a two-year contract with an option for 2009.

On December 18, the Blue Jays announced that they had re-signed centre fielder Vernon Wells to a seven-year contract worth $126 million, to come into effect after the 2007 season. It was the largest contract in club history.

Season standings

Record vs. opponents

2006 Draft picks
Source 

The 2006 MLB Draft was held on June 6–7.

Roster

Game log

|- bgcolor="bbffbb"
| 1 || April 4 || Twins || 6–3 || Halladay (1–0) || Santana (0–1) || Ryan (1) || 50,449 || 1–0
|- bgcolor="ffbbbb"
| 2 || April 5 || Twins || 13–4 || Radke (1–0) || Towers (0–1) || || 18,156 || 1–1
|- bgcolor="bbffbb"
| 3 || April 6 || Twins || 6–3 || Chacín (1–0) || Silva (0–1) || Ryan  (2) || 16,221 || 2–1
|- bgcolor="ffbbbb"
| 4 || April 7 || Devil Rays || 9–8 || Dunn (1–0) || Walker (0–1) || Miceli (1) || 15,631 || 2–2
|- bgcolor="bbffbb"
| 5 || April 8 || Devil Rays || 8–4 || Tallet (1–0) || Childers (0–1) || || 18,755 || 3–2
|- bgcolor="ffbbbb"
| 6 || April 9 || Devil Rays || 5–2 || Kazmir (1–1) || Halladay (1–1) || Miceli (2) || 20,184 || 3–3
|- bgcolor="ffbbbb"
| 7 || April 11 || @ Red Sox || 5–3 || Beckett (2–0) || Towers (0–2) || Papelbon (4) || 35,491 || 3–4
|- bgcolor="bbffbb"
| 8 || April 12 || @ Red Sox || 8–4 || Chacín (2–0) || Wells (0–1) || || 36,378 || 4–4
|- bgcolor="bbffbb"
| 9 || April 13 || @ Red Sox || 8–6 || Lilly (1–0) || Clement (1–1) || Ryan  (3) || 36,524 || 5–4
|- bgcolor="bbffbb"
| 10 || April 14 || @ White Sox || 13–7 || Walker (1–1) || Vázquez (0–1) || || 31,418 || 6–4
|- bgcolor="ffbbbb"
| 11 || April 15 || @ White Sox || 4–2 || Buehrle (2–0) || Burnett (0–1) || Jenks (4) || 33,247 || 6–5
|- bgcolor="ffbbbb"
| 12 || April 16 || @ White Sox || 6–4  || García (2–1) || Towers (0–3)  || || 27,137 || 6–6
|- bgcolor="bbffbb"
| 13 || April 18 || Yankees || 10–5 || Chacín (3–0) || Johnson (2–2) || || 48,776 || 7–6
|- bgcolor="ffbbbb"
| 14 || April 19 || Yankees || 3–1 || Mussina (2–1) || Lilly (1–1) || Rivera (2) || 32,886 || 7–7
|- bgcolor="bbffbb"
| 15 || April 21 || Red Sox || 7–6  || Speier (1–0) || Foulke (0–1)  || || 28,333 || 8–7
|- bgcolor="bbffbb"
| 16 || April 22 || Red Sox || 8–1 || Halladay (2–1) || DiNardo (0–1) || Walker (1) || 34,387 || 9–7
|- bgcolor="ffbbbb"
| 17 || April 23 || Red Sox || 6–3 || Clement (2–1) || Towers (0–4) || Papelbon (8) || 28,737 || 9–8
|- bgcolor="bbffbb"
| 18 || April 25 || Orioles || 7–3 || Chacín (4–0) || López (1–2) || || 32,257 || 10–8
|- bgcolor="bbffbb"
| 19 || April 26 || Orioles || 8–2 || Lilly (2–1) || Bédard (4–1) || || 19,336 || 11–8
|- bgcolor="ffbbbb"
| 20 || April 27 || Orioles || 7–5 || Benson (3–2) || Janssen (0–1) || || 18,756 || 11–9
|- bgcolor="bbffbb"
| 21 || April 28 || @ Yankees || 7–2 || Halladay (3–1) || Wright (0–2) || Ryan  (4) || 47,204 || 12–9
|- bgcolor="ffbbbb"
| 22 || April 29 || @ Yankees || 17–6 || Johnson (4–2) || Towers (0–5) || || 50,119 || 12–10
|- bgcolor="ffbbbb"
| 23 || April 30 || @ Yankees || 4–1 || Mussina (4–1) || Chacín (4–1) || Rivera (4) || 52,954 || 12–11

|- bgcolor="bbffbb"
| 24 || May 1 || @ Orioles || 9–7 || Lilly (3–1) || Hawkins (0–1) || Ryan  (5) || 14,315 || 13–11
|- bgcolor="ffbbbb"
| 25 || May 2 || @ Orioles || 9–2 || Benson (4–2) || Janssen (0–2) || Williams (1) || 15,795 || 13–12
|- bgcolor="bbffbb"
| 26 || May 3 || @ Red Sox || 7–6 || McGowan (1–0) || Papelbon (0–1) || Ryan  (6) || 35,881 || 14–12
|- bgcolor="ffbbbb"
| 27 || May 4 || @ Red Sox || 7–4 || Clement (3–2) || Towers (0–6) || Papelbon (11) || 36,396 || 14–13
|- bgcolor="bbffbb"
| 28 || May 5 || Angels || 13–3 || Chacín (5–1) || Santana (2–1) || || 22,227 || 15–13
|- bgcolor="ffbbbb"
| 29 || May 6 || Angels || 3–0 || Escobar (4–2) || Lilly (3–2) || Rodríguez (9) || 29,761 || 15–14
|- bgcolor="bbffbb"
| 30 || May 7 || Angels || 3–1 || Janssen (1–2) || Lackey (3–3) || Ryan  (7) || 24,351 || 16–14
|- bgcolor="bbffbb"
| 31 || May 8 || Angels || 5–1 || Halladay (4–1) || Weaver (1–5) || || 18,611 || 17–14
|- bgcolor="ffbbbb"
| 32 || May 9 || Athletics || 6–5 || Haren (2–3) || Towers (0–7) || Street (5) || 36,269 || 17–15
|- bgcolor="bbffbb"
| 33 || May 10 || Athletics || 9–7 || Rosario (1–0) || Blanton (3–4) || Ryan  (8) || 19,269 || 18–15
|- bgcolor="bbffbb"
| 34 || May 11 || Athletics || 8–3 || Lilly (4–2) || Saarloos (1–1) || || 23,974 || 19–15
|- bgcolor="ffbbbb"
| 35 || May 12 || @ Devil Rays || 4–1 || McClung (2–4) || Janssen (1–3) || Walker (5) || 11,816 || 19–16
|- bgcolor="bbffbb"
| 36 || May 13 || @ Devil Rays || 8–1 || Halladay (5–1) || Hendrickson (2–3) || || 15,184 || 20–16
|- bgcolor="bbffbb"
| 37 || May 14 || @ Devil Rays || 8–3 || Towers (1–7) || Fossum (1–2) || || 12,224 || 21–16
|- bgcolor="ffbbbb"
| 38 || May 16 || @ Angels || 8–3 || Santana (4–1) || Lilly (4–3) || || 43,066 || 21–17
|- bgcolor="bbffbb"
| 39 || May 17 || @ Angels || 3–0 || Janssen (2–3) || Escobar (5–3) || Ryan  (9) || 38,767 || 22–17
|- bgcolor="bbffbb"
| 40 || May 18 || @ Angels || 8–4 || Frasor (1–0) || Rodríguez (0–1) || || 37,850 || 23–17
|- bgcolor="ffbbbb"
| 41 || May 19 || @ Rockies || 8–3 || Cook (5–3) || Towers (1–8) || || 26,011 || 23–18
|- bgcolor="ffbbbb"
| 42 || May 20 || @ Rockies || 5–1 || Francis (3–3) || Taubenheim (0–1) || || 26,212 || 23–19
|- bgcolor="ffbbbb"
| 43 || May 21 || @ Rockies || 5–3 || Fogg (3–2) || Lilly (4–4) || Fuentes (10) || 30,291 || 23–20
|- bgcolor="bbffbb"
| 44 || May 22 || Devil Rays || 6–4 || Janssen (3–3) || McClung (2–5) || Ryan  (10) || 22,563 || 24–20
|- bgcolor="bbffbb"
| 45 || May 23 || Devil Rays || 4–1 || Halladay (6–1) || Hendrickson (3–4) || Ryan  (11) || 34,594 || 25–20
|- bgcolor="ffbbbb"
| 46 || May 24 || Devil Rays || 10–8 || Camp (2–0) || Frasor (1–1) || Walker (9) || 20,187 || 25–21
|- bgcolor="bbffbb"
| 47 || May 26 || White Sox || 8–2 || Lilly (5–4) || García (7–2) || || 22,729 || 26–21
|- bgcolor="bbffbb"
| 48 || May 27 || White Sox || 3–2 || Schoeneweis (1–0) || Nelson (0–1) || || 30,063 || 27–21
|- bgcolor="ffbbbb"
| 49 || May 28 || White Sox || 7–5 || Garland (4–2) || Taubenheim (0–2) || Jenks (14) || 35,277 || 27–22
|- bgcolor="bbffbb"
| 50 || May 29 || Red Sox || 7–6 || Ryan (1–0) || Riske (0–1) || || 24,038 || 28–22
|- bgcolor="bbffbb"
| 51 || May 30 || Red Sox || 8–5 || Chacín (6–1) || Beckett (7–2) || Ryan  (12) || 27,324 || 29–22
|- bgcolor="ffbbbb"
| 52 || May 31 || Red Sox || 8–6 || Van Buren (1–0) || Lilly (5–5) || Papelbon (19) || 24,526 || 29–23

|- bgcolor="bbffbb"
| 53 || June 2 || @ Devil Rays || 13–4 || Janssen (4–3) || McClung (2–7) || || 9,463 || 30–23
|- bgcolor="bbffbb"
| 54 || June 3 || @ Devil Rays || 6–2 || Halladay (7–1) || Hendrickson (3–6) || Ryan  (13) || 15,696 || 31–23
|- bgcolor="ffbbbb"
| 55 || June 4 || @ Devil Rays || 10–5 || Waechter (1–4) || Chacín (6–2) || || 14,347 || 31–24
|- bgcolor="ffbbbb"
| 56 || June 5 || @ Orioles || 4–0 || Cabrera (3–2) || Lilly (5–6) || || 15,185 || 31–25
|- bgcolor="bbffbb"
| 57 || June 6 || @ Orioles || 6–4 || Downs (1–0) || Britton (0–1) || Ryan  (14) || 16,868 || 32–25
|- bgcolor="bbffbb"
| 58 || June 7 || @ Orioles || 5–3 || Janssen (5–3) || Benson (6–5) || Ryan  (15) || 15,803 || 33–25
|- bgcolor="ffbbbb"
| 59 || June 8 || @ Orioles || 7–5 || Birkins (2–0) || Rosario (1–1) || Ray (15) || 17,637 || 33–26
|- bgcolor="bbffbb"
| 60 || June 9 || Tigers || 10–5 || Frasor (2–1) || Jones (0–4) || || 21,425 || 34–26
|- bgcolor="ffbbbb"
| 61 || June 10 || Tigers || 5–3 || Miner (1–1) || Lilly (5–7) || Jones (17) || 27,021 || 34–27
|- bgcolor="ffbbbb"
| 62 || June 11 || Tigers || 10–5 || Robertson (6–3) || Taubenheim (0–3) || Zumaya (1) || 30,404 || 34–28
|- bgcolor="ffbbbb"
| 63 || June 12 || Orioles || 6–4 || Benson (7–5) || Janssen (5–4) || Ray (16) || 17,876 || 34–29
|- bgcolor="bbffbb"
| 64 || June 13 || Orioles || 7–1 || Halladay (8–1) || Loewen (0–1) || || 20,766 || 35–29
|- bgcolor="bbffbb"
| 65 || June 14 || Orioles || 6–3 || Chulk (1–0) || López (4–8) || Ryan  (16) || 23,325 || 36–29
|- bgcolor="bbffbb"
| 66 || June 15 || Orioles || 4–2 || Lilly (6–7) || Cabrera (4–3) || Ryan  (17) || 32,285 || 37–29
|- bgcolor="ffbbbb"
| 67 || June 16 || @ Marlins || 3–1 || Olsen (6–3) || Taubenheim (0–4) || Tankersley (2) || 10,242 || 37–30
|- bgcolor="ffbbbb"
| 68 || June 17 || @ Marlins || 8–2 || Moehler (5–5) || Janssen (5–5) || || 12,099 || 37–31
|- bgcolor="ffbbbb"
| 69 || June 18 || @ Marlins || 4–1 || Johnson (6–4) || Halladay (8–2) || Borowski (11) || 10,536 || 37–32
|- bgcolor="bbffbb"
| 70 || June 20 || @ Braves || 6–5 || Schoeneweis (2–0) || Yates (0–1) || Ryan  (18) || 26,915 || 38–32
|- bgcolor="bbffbb"
| 71 || June 21 || @ Braves || 6–3 || Lilly (7–7) || Hudson (6–6) || Ryan  (19) || 26,232 || 39–32
|- bgcolor="bbffbb"
| 72 || June 22 || @ Braves || 3–2 || Taubenheim (1–4) || Remlinger (2–4) || Ryan  (20) || 26,829 || 40–32
|- bgcolor="ffbbbb"
| 73 || June 23 || Mets || 6–1 || Glavine (11–2) || Janssen (5–6) || || 28,507 || 40–33
|- bgcolor="bbffbb"
| 74 || June 24 || Mets || 7–4 || Halladay (9–2) || Hernández (4–7) || Ryan  (21) || 31,327 || 41–33
|- bgcolor="ffbbbb"
| 75 || June 25 || Mets || 7–4 || Trachsel (6–4) || Towers (1–9) || Wagner (15) || 32,277 || 41–34
|- bgcolor="bbffbb"
| 76 || June 27 || Nationals || 6–0 || Burnett (1–1) || Ortiz (5–6) || || 20,288 || 42–34
|- bgcolor="bbffbb"
| 77 || June 28 || Nationals || 6–1 || Lilly (8–7) || Hill (1–3) || || 17,067 || 43–34
|- bgcolor="bbffbb"
| 78 || June 29 || Nationals || 8–4 || Halladay (10–2) || Patterson (1–2) || || 17,175 || 44–34
|- bgcolor="bbffbb"
| 79 || June 30 || Phillies || 8–1 || Janssen (6–6) || Bernero (0–1) || || 17,311 || 45–34

|- bgcolor="bbffbb"
| 80 || July 1 || Phillies || 5–2 || Downs (2–0) || Lidle (4–7) || Ryan  (22) || 24,248 || 46–34
|- bgcolor="ffbbbb"
| 81 || July 2 || Phillies || 11–6 || Geary (5–0) || Burnett (1–2) || || 26,177 || 46–35
|- bgcolor="ffbbbb"
| 82 || July 3 || @ Rangers || 6–1 || Rheinecker (4–2) || Lilly (8–8) || || 30,021 || 46–36
|- bgcolor="bbffbb"
| 83 || July 4 || @ Rangers || 3–2 || Halladay (11–2) || Koronka (6–5) || Ryan  (23) || 42,255 || 47–36
|- bgcolor="ffbbbb"
| 84 || July 5 || @ Rangers || 9–3 || Padilla (8–5) || Janssen (6–7) || Cordero (6) || 25,803 || 47–37
|- bgcolor="ffbbbb"
| 85 || July 6 || @ Royals || 6–2 || Redman (6–4) || Taubenheim (1–5) || || 10,858 || 47–38
|- bgcolor="ffbbbb"
| 86 || July 7 || @ Royals || 13–3 || Hudson (2–3) || Burnett (1–3) || || 17,162 || 47–39
|- bgcolor="bbffbb"
| 87 || July 8 || @ Royals || 7–5 || Tallet (2–0) || Peralta (1–1) || Ryan  (24) || 22,635 || 48–39
|- bgcolor="bbffbb"
| 88 || July 9 || @ Royals || 11–3 || Halladay (12–2) || Gobble (3–2) || || 17,748 || 49–39
|- bgcolor="ffbbbb"
| 89 || July 14 || Mariners || 5–3 || Meche (9–4) || Janssen (6–8) || Putz (17) || 23,443 || 49–40
|- bgcolor="bbffbb"
| 90 || July 15 || Mariners || 7–6 || Downs (3–0) || Fruto (0–1) || || 36,069 || 50–40
|- bgcolor="bbffbb"
| 91 || July 16 || Mariners || 4–3 || Downs (4–0) || Sherrill (2–2) || || 28,679 || 51–40
|- bgcolor="bbffbb"
| 92 || July 17 || Rangers || 10–1 || Lilly (9–8) || Koronka (6–6) || || 16,872 || 52–40
|- bgcolor="ffbbbb"
| 93 || July 18 || Rangers || 5–2 || Padilla (10–5) || Schoeneweis (2–1) || Otsuka (19) || 20,017 || 52–41
|- bgcolor="ffbbbb"
| 94 || July 19 || Rangers || 5–4 || Millwood (10–5) || Janssen (6–9) || Otsuka (20) || 20,778 || 52–42
|- bgcolor="bbffbb"
| 95 || July 20 || Yankees || 5–4 || Tallet (3–0) || Rivera (4–5) || || 42,336 || 53–42
|- bgcolor="bbffbb"
| 96 || July 21 || Yankees || 7–3 || Burnett (2–3) || Wright (6–6) || Schoeneweis (1) || 40,149 || 54–42
|- bgcolor="ffbbbb"
| 97 || July 22 || Yankees || 5–4 || Wang (11–4) || Downs (4–1) || Rivera (23) || 50,014 || 54–43
|- bgcolor="bbffbb"
| 98 || July 23 || Yankees || 13–5 || Marcum (1–0) || Ponson (0–1) || || 42,337 || 55–43
|- bgcolor="ffbbbb"
| 99 || July 24 || @ Mariners || 7–3 || Piñeiro (7–8) || Janssen (6–10) || || 29,787 || 55–44
|- bgcolor="bbffbb"
| 100 || July 25 || @ Mariners || 12–3 || Halladay (13–2) || Meche (9–5) || || 30,793 || 56–44
|- bgcolor="ffbbbb"
| 101 || July 26 || @ Mariners || 7–4 || Moyer (6–9) || Burnett (2–4) || Putz (20) || 33,629 || 56–45
|- bgcolor="ffbbbb"
| 102 || July 27 || @ Athletics || 5–2 || Blanton (11–8) || Lilly (9–9) || Street (21) || 19,251 || 56–46
|- bgcolor="bbffbb"
| 103 || July 28 || @ Athletics || 4–3 || Downs (5–1) || Loaiza (4–7) || Ryan  (25) || 22,217 || 57–46
|- bgcolor="ffbbbb"
| 104 || July 29 || @ Athletics || 7–4 || Zito (11–7) || McGowan (1–1) || Street (22) || 25,627 || 57–47
|- bgcolor="ffbbbb"
| 105 || July 30 || @ Athletics || 6–5 || Street (4–3) || Ryan (1–1) || || 29,709 || 57–48

|- bgcolor="ffbbbb"
| 106 || August 1 || @ Yankees || 5–1 || Wright (7–6) || Burnett (2–5) || || 52,237 || 57–49
|- bgcolor="ffbbbb"
| 107 || August 2 || @ Yankees || 7–2 || Wang (13–4) || Lilly (9–10) || || 54,414 || 57–50
|- bgcolor="ffbbbb"
| 108 || August 3 || @ Yankees || 8–1 || Lidle (1–0) || Marcum (1–1) || || 52,156 || 57–51
|- bgcolor="ffbbbb"
| 109 || August 4 || White Sox || 6–4 || Garland (12–3) || Halladay (13–3) || Jenks (30) || 30,060 || 57–52
|- bgcolor="ffbbbb"
| 110 || August 5 || White Sox || 7–1 || Vázquez (10–6) || Rosario (1–2) || || 35,117 || 57–53
|- bgcolor="bbffbb"
| 111 || August 6 || White Sox || 7–3 || Burnett (3–5) || Contreras (10–4) || || 36,453 || 58–53
|- bgcolor="bbffbb"
| 112 || August 7 || Orioles || 8–1 || Accardo (1–0) || Ortiz (0–3) || League (1) || 23,838 || 59–53
|- bgcolor="ffbbbb"
| 113 || August 8 || Orioles || 8–4 || Cabrera (5–7) || Schoeneweis (2–2) || || 28,823 || 59–54
|- bgcolor="bbffbb"
| 114 || August 9 || Orioles || 4–3 || Halladay (14–3) || Bédard (12–8) || Ryan  (26) || 34,199 || 60–54
|- bgcolor="bbffbb"
| 115 || August 10 || @ Twins || 5–0 || Lilly (10–10) || Silva (8–10) || || 30,118 || 61–54
|- bgcolor="bbffbb"
| 116 || August 11 || @ Twins || 7–1 || Burnett (4–5) || Garza (0–1) || || 31,814 || 62–54
|- bgcolor="bbffbb"
| 117 || August 12 || @ Twins || 4–0 || Downs (6–1) || Bonser (2–4) || || 36,261 || 63–54
|- bgcolor="ffbbbb"
| 118 || August 13 || @ Twins || 5–0 || Radke (12–8) || Marcum (1–2) || || 32,811 || 63–55
|- bgcolor="bbffbb"
| 119 || August 15 || @ Devil Rays || 4–3 || Halladay (15–3) || Meadows (2–3) || Ryan  (27) || 9,217 || 64–55
|- bgcolor="ffbbbb"
| 120 || August 16 || @ Devil Rays || 8–3 || Shields (5–6) || Lilly (10–11) || || 8,195 || 64–56
|- bgcolor="bbffbb"
| 121 || August 17 || @ Devil Rays || 6–2 || Burnett (5–5) || Meadows (2–4) || || 8,697 || 65–56
|- bgcolor="ffbbbb"
| 122 || August 18 || @ Orioles || 7–2 || Benson (10–9) || Downs (6–2) || || 22,679 || 65–57
|- bgcolor="ffbbbb"
| 123 || August 19 || @ Orioles || 15–0 || Cabrera (6–8) || Marcum (1–3) || || 25,380 || 65–58
|- bgcolor="bbffbb"
| 124 || August 20 || @ Orioles || 9–2 || Halladay (16–3) || Bédard (12–9) || || 23,639 || 66–58
|- bgcolor="ffbbbb"
| 125 || August 21 || Athletics || 12–10 || Haren (12–9) || League (0–1) || Duchscherer (4) || 28,280 || 66–59
|- bgcolor="bbffbb"
| 126 || August 22 || Athletics || 4–3 || Burnett (6–5) || Halsey (3–4) || Ryan  (28) || 30,071 || 67–59
|- bgcolor="ffbbbb"
| 127 || August 23 || Athletics || 6–0 || Loaiza (7–7) || Chacín (6–3) || || 32,516 || 67–60
|- bgcolor="bbffbb"
| 128 || August 25 || Royals || 6–3 || Marcum (2–3) || Hudson (6–5) || Ryan  (29) || 26,343 || 68–60
|- bgcolor="ffbbbb"
| 129 || August 26 || Royals || 2–0 || Hernández (4–8) || Halladay (16–4) || || 38,070 || 68–61
|- bgcolor="bbffbb"
| 130 || August 27 || Royals || 10–6 || Lilly (11–11) || Pérez (1–2) || || 36,417 || 69–61
|- bgcolor="ffbbbb"
| 131 || August 28 || @ Indians || 6–4 || Byrd (9–6) || Burnett (6–6) || Mastny (4) || 19,623 || 69–62
|- bgcolor="ffbbbb"
| 132 || August 29 || @ Indians || 5–2 || Sabathia (10–8) || League (0–2) || || 21,563 || 69–63
|- bgcolor="ffbbbb"
| 133 || August 30 || @ Indians || 3–2 || Betancourt (3–4) || Ryan (1–2) || || 22,065 || 69–64
|- bgcolor="ffbbbb"
| 134 || August 31 || @ Red Sox || 6–4 || Delcarmen (2–0) || Halladay (16–5) || Papelbon (35) || 36,238 || 69–65

|- bgcolor="ffbbbb"
| 135 || September 1 || @ Red Sox || 2–1 || Snyder (4–3) || Lilly (11–12) || Timlin (3) || 36,235 || 69–66
|- bgcolor="bbffbb"
| 136 || September 2 || @ Red Sox || 5–1 || Burnett (7–6) || Jarvis (0–1) || || 35,973 || 70–66
|- bgcolor="bbffbb"
| 137 || September 3 || @ Red Sox || 6–1 || Chacín (7–3) || Beckett (14–10) || || 35,719 || 71–66
|- bgcolor="bbffbb"
| 138 || September 4 || Indians || 4–3 || League (1–2) || Sabathia (10–9) || Ryan  (30) || 27,864 || 72–66
|- bgcolor="ffbbbb"
| 139 || September 5 || Indians || 7–2 || Sowers (7–3) || Accardo (1–1) || || 18,517 || 72–67
|- bgcolor="bbffbb"
| 140 || September 6 || Indians || 3–2 || Lilly (12–12) || Westbrook (12–9) || Ryan  (31) || 20,406 || 73–67
|- bgcolor="ffbbbb"
| 141 || September 8 || @ Angels || 4–1 || Saunders (5–2) || Burnett (7–7) || Rodríguez (40) || 42,259 || 73–68
|- bgcolor="bbffbb"
| 142 || September 9 || @ Angels || 2–1 || Chacín (8–3) || Escobar (10–13) || Ryan  (32) || 44,007 || 74–68
|- bgcolor="ffbbbb"
| 143 || September 10 || @ Angels || 4–3 || Weaver (11–2) || Towers (1–10) || Rodríguez (41) || 40,506 || 74–69
|- bgcolor="bbffbb"
| 144 || September 11 || @ Mariners || 6–2 || Lilly (13–12) || Woods (4–3) || || 24,462 || 75–69
|- bgcolor="ffbbbb"
| 145 || September 12 || @ Mariners || 4–2 || Meche (10–8) || Marcum (2–4) || Putz (32) || 26,144 || 75–70
|- bgcolor="bbffbb"
| 146 || September 13 || @ Mariners || 10–0 || Burnett (8–7) || Baek (3–1) || || 26,225 || 76–70
|- bgcolor="bbffbb"
| 147 || September 15 || Devil Rays || 5–4 || Ryan (2–2) || Meadows (3–6) || || 27,607 || 77–70
|- bgcolor="bbffbb"
| 148 || September 16 || Devil Rays || 6–1 || Lilly (14–12) || Howell (0–3) || || 30,698 || 78–70
|- bgcolor="bbffbb"
| 149 || September 17 || Devil Rays || 5–3 || Speier (2–0) || Camp (7–4) || Ryan  (33) || 32,959 || 79–70
|- bgcolor="ffbbbb"
| 150 || September 18 || Yankees || 7–6 || Rasner (3–0) || Burnett (8–8) || Veras (1) || 32,846 || 79–71
|- bgcolor="ffbbbb"
| 151 || September 19 || Yankees || 6–3 || Karstens (2–1) || Frasor (2–2) || Farnsworth (6) || 30,793 || 79–72
|- bgcolor="bbffbb"
| 152 || September 20 || Yankees || 3–2 || Romero (1–0) || Henn (0–1) || Ryan  (34) || 33,029 || 80–72
|- bgcolor="ffbbbb"
| 153 || September 22 || Red Sox || 7–1 || Tavárez (4–4) || Lilly (14–13) || || 33,874 || 80–73
|- bgcolor="bbffbb"
| 154 || September 23 || Red Sox || 5–3 || Burnett (9–8) || Hansack (0–1) || Ryan  (35) || 42,267 || 81–73
|- bgcolor="bbffbb"
| 155 || September 24 || Red Sox || 13–4 || Chacín (9–3) || Snyder (4–5) || || 44,212 || 82–73
|- bgcolor="bbffbb"
| 156 || September 25 || Red Sox || 5–0 || Marcum (3–4) || Wakefield (7–11) || || 40,123 || 83–73
|- bgcolor="ffbbbb"
| 157 || September 26 || @ Tigers || 4–3 || Bonderman (14–8) || McGowan (1–2) || Jones (37) || 27,908 || 83–74
|- bgcolor="bbffbb"
| 158 || September 27 || @ Tigers || 7–4 || Lilly (15–13) || Robertson (13–13) || Ryan  (36) || 26,430 || 84–74
|- bgcolor="bbffbb"
| 159 || September 28 || @ Tigers || 8–6 || Burnett (10–8) || Rogers (17–7) || Ryan  (37) || 28,670 || 85–74
|- bgcolor="ffbbbb"
| 160 || September 29 || @ Yankees || 7–2 || Mussina (15–7) || Chacín (9–4) || || 52,331 || 85–75
|- bgcolor="bbffbb"
| 161 || September 30 || @ Yankees || 6–5 || Frasor (3–2) || Myers (1–2) || Ryan  (38) || 54,576 || 86–75

|- bgcolor="bbffbb"
| 162 || October 1 || @ Yankees || 7–5 || Towers (2–10) || Farnsworth (3–6) || Downs (1) || 54,886 || 87–75

Player stats

Batting

Starters by position
Note: Pos = Position; G = Games played; AB = At bats; H = Hits; Avg. = Batting average; HR = Home runs; RBI = Runs batted in

Other batters
Note: G = Games played; AB = At bats; H = Hits; Avg. = Batting average; HR = Home runs; RBI = Runs batted in

Pitching

Starting pitchers
Note: G = Games pitched; IP = Innings pitched; W = Wins; L = Losses; ERA = Earned run average; SO = Strikeouts

Other pitchers
Note: G = Games pitched; IP = Innings pitched; W = Wins; L = Losses; ERA = Earned run average; SO = Strikeouts

Relief pitchers
Note: G = Games pitched; W = Wins; L = Losses; SV = Saves; ERA = Earned run average; SO = Strikeouts

Award winners
Vernon Wells, Gold Glove Award
All-Star Game
Troy Glaus, third base
 Roy Halladay, pitcher
 Alex Ríos, outfield
 B. J. Ryan, pitcher
 Vernon Wells, outfield

Farm system

References

External links
2006 Toronto Blue Jays team page at Baseball Reference
2006 Toronto Blue Jays team page at www.baseball-almanac.com

Toronto Blue Jays seasons
Toronto Blue Jays season
2006 in Canadian sports
2006 in Toronto